Petra is a former municipality in Pieria regional unit, Greece. Since the 2011 local government reform it is part of the municipality Katerini, of which it is a municipal unit. The municipal unit has an area of 219.318 km2. The population was 4,888 in 2011. The seat of the municipality was in Mesaia Milia. Petra is also the name of a small settlement in the community Foteina, that had a population of 37 in 2011.

References

Notes
Travels in northern Greece By William Martin Leake page 337 

Populated places in Pieria (regional unit)
Katerini